Namiya is a 2017 Chinese fantasy film directed by Han Jie, based on the 2012 novel Miracles of the Namiya General Store by Keigo Higashino. It stars Jackie Chan as the titular shop owner, with Dilraba Dilmurat, Karry Wang and Hao Lei in supporting role. It was released on 29 December 2017 in China.

Cast
 Karry Wang as Xiao Bo
 Dilraba Dilmurat as Tong Tong
 Dong Zijian as Ah Jie
 Lee Hong-chi as Qin Lang
 Qin Hao
 Hao Lei
 Chen Duling as Wang Wang
 Jackie Chan as Namiya (special appearance)

Production
The film was produced by Emperor Motion Pictures, PMF Pictures and Wanda Media. Its trailer was released on December 2, 2017.

References

External links
 
 

2017 films
2017 fantasy films
2010s Mandarin-language films
Chinese fantasy films
Films based on works by Keigo Higashino
Films scored by Nathan Wang